Garmo Church is a parish church of the Church of Norway in Lom Municipality in Innlandet county, Norway. It is located in the village of Garmo. It is the church for the Garmo parish which is part of the Nord-Gudbrandsdal prosti (deanery) in the Diocese of Hamar. The white, wooden church was built in a long church design in 1879 using plans drawn up by the architect Jacob Wilhelm Nordan. The church seats about 150 people.

History
The earliest existing historical records of the church date back to the year 1220, but the church was not new that year. The first church in Garmo was a wooden church that was built in the early 11th century. Probably during the 13th century, the old church was torn down and a new wooden stave church was built on the same site. In 1675, the church was described as old and rotten, and new construction was recommended, but this was not carried out. In 1690, the open-air exterior corridors that surrounded the church were removed, the church was given a new tower on the roof, and it was enlarged by adding transept cross arms which gave the church a cruciform design.

By the 1870s, the old church had grown too small for the parish, so plans were made for a new church to be built. The architect was Jacob Wilhelm Nordan and the lead builder was Elias A. Tonning from Stryn. It was a wooden long church. The new church was built in 1879 and it was consecrated on 12 September 1879. Afterwards, the old Garmo Stave Church was carefully disassembled and moved to Lillehammer where it was rebuilt and set up as a museum.

Media gallery

See also
List of churches in Hamar

References

Lom, Norway
Churches in Innlandet
Long churches in Norway
Wooden churches in Norway
19th-century Church of Norway church buildings
Churches completed in 1879
11th-century establishments in Norway